Langendorf may refer to:

Places
Langendorf, Bavaria, Germany
Langendorf, Saxony-Anhalt, Germany
Langendorf, Lower Saxony, Germany
Langendorf, Switzerland
Wielowieś, Silesian Voivodeship, Poland
Langendorf, a former village now in Săcele, Romania

People
Maik Langendorf (born 1972), Austrian darts player
Antonie Langendorf (1894–1969), German activist and politician
Kurt Langendorf (1920–2011), German opponent of Nazis

See also
Oskar Langendorff (1853–1908), German physician
Langendorff heart, a medical technique used with animals
Johnnie Langendorff, figure in the 2017 Sutherland Springs church shooting